Banner is an English surname. Notable people with the surname include:

People:
 Arthur Banner (1918–1980), English footballer and manager
 Billy Banner (1878–1936), English footballer
 Bob Banner (1921–2011), American producer, writer and director
 Catherine Banner (born 1989), British author
 David Banner (born 1974), American rapper, record producer and activist
 Fiona Banner (born 1966), British artist
 Harmood Banner (1783–1865), British accountant whose company was the origin of the accountancy firm Coopers & Lybrand
 Jérôme Le Banner (born 1972), French kickboxer
 Joe Banner (born 1953), former National Football League executive
 John Banner (1910–1973), Austrian actor who played Sgt. Schultz on the TV show Hogan's Heroes
 Lois Banner (born 1939), American feminist academic
 Michael Banner, Dean and Fellow of Trinity College, Cambridge
 Mitch Banner (born 1990), former Australian Rules Football player
 Penny Banner, American wrestler
 Peter Banner, English-born architect and builder in the early 19th century
 Peter Banner (rugby league) (born 1948), English rugby league player
 Zach Banner (born 1993), American football player

Fictional characters:
 Dr. Bruce Banner/Dr. David Bruce Banner, the alter ego of The Incredible Hulk
 Bruce Banner (Marvel Cinematic Universe), the 21st-century film version of this superhero
 Betty Ross Banner, a Marvel Comics character whose alter ego is the Red She-Hulk
 Brian Banner, a Marvel Comics villain; abusive father of Bruce Banner
 Rex Banner, the Beer Baron in The Simpsons
 Lyman Banner, from the anime series Yu-Gi-Oh! GX

English-language surnames